Posto da Mata is a district of the municipality of Nova Viçosa in the state of Bahia, Brazil. The name literally means a station in the woods, as there was a train station in the middle of the Atlantic forest that connected the south of the state of Bahia with the east of Minas Gerais, serving as a place to recharge the fuel. 

The district is the largest of all three in the municipality, having a population of over 20 000 people.

References

Populated coastal places in Bahia